Abrazo Central Campus is a 216-bed acute care facility and teaching hospital located in Phoenix, Arizona, United States.

History
Abrazo Central Campus (formerly called Phoenix Baptist Hospital) opened in 1963. In 1999, Phoenix Baptist and Arrowhead Hospitals were acquired by Vanguard Health Systems. In 2003, Vanguard established Abrazo Community Health Network (formerly Abrazo Health Care) as its Arizona subsidiary. Abrazo Community Health Network is located in Phoenix, Arizona. In 2013, Vanguard was acquired by Tenet Healthcare.

Services
 Cardiovascular care
 Orthopedics
 Breast health
 Women's services
 Radiology
 Neurology
 daVinci robotic surgery
 24-hour Emergency care

Accreditations
 Accredited Chest Pain Center by The Society of Chest Pain Centers
 Designated a Certified Primary Stroke Center by the Joint Commission
 Fully accredited by The Joint Commission
 Get With The Guidelines Gold Plus Achievement Award- American Heart Association and American Stroke Association Stroke care
 50 Top Cardiovascular Hospitals Truven Health Analytics

References

External links
 BHHS Legacy Foundation, the former owner of Phoenix Baptist Hospital

Tenet Healthcare
Hospitals in Arizona
Companies based in Phoenix, Arizona